Miana Gondal is a village in Mandi Bahauddin District, Punjab, Pakistan. This city is in Mandi Bahauddin District, which is the so-called the Land of Judges.

As of 2008, the total population is about 30,000.

There are many other villages close by, including Warayaiet , Chah Garab, Noor Abad (Lokri), Head Faqiryan. 

Agriculture and farming are the main professions in the region. Manufacturing is another profession, for example, by Lohar blacksmiths. The peoples of Miana Gondal are known for their hospitality and industriousness. 

Major castes in this village include Ranjha, Samor, Gondal, Tulla, Ghuhg.

Religion
On the whole, Islam is the majority religion. Minorities include Christians, Hindus and Sikhs.

References

Villages in Mandi Bahauddin District
Union councils of Mandi Bahauddin District